Spasoje (Cyrillic script: Спасоје) is a masculine given name of Slavic origin. It may refer to:

Spasoje Bulajič (born 1975), Slovenian footballer
Spasoje Samardžić (born 1941), Serbian footballer
Spasoje Tuševljak (born 1952), Bosnian Serb economist and politician

See also
Spasojević

Slavic masculine given names
Serbian masculine given names